Gagik Manukyan (born 22 December 1974; died 5 August 2002), was an Armenian football midfielder.

Manukyan was a member of the Armenia national team, being capped 5 times.

External links
 

Living people
1978 births
FC Yerevan players
Araks Ararat FC players
FC Ararat Yerevan players
Armenian footballers
Armenia international footballers
Armenian Premier League players
Association football midfielders